Craig Ashall (born ), also known by the nickname of "Ash", is a rugby league footballer who last played for the North Wales Crusaders.

Playing career
He started his career at St Helens where he made his one and only first-grade appearance against the Catalans Dragons; a game in which St Helens fielded a weakened side in preparation for the 2006 Challenge Cup Final. Ashall scored a try in this 26-22 defeat. He transferred to Swinton in 2006. Ashall also played for the Rochdale Hornets before moving to Halifax. While at Halifax he was joined by his brother Karl Ashall and they then both signed for North Wales for the 2014 season.

References

External links
Saints Heritage Society profile

1985 births
Living people
English rugby league players
Halifax R.L.F.C. players
North Wales Crusaders players
Rochdale Hornets players
Rugby league five-eighths
Rugby league locks
St Helens R.F.C. players
Swinton Lions players